"Fool No More" is a song by British pop music group S Club 8 released as the first single from their second album, Sundown (2003). Released on 30 June 2003, it reached number four on the UK Singles Chart and number 20 on the Irish Singles Chart.

Composition

Frankie Sandford sings the song's intro, the first verse, the bridge at the end of every chorus, the fourth verse, the main bridge of the song, and backing vocals during the final chorus and the end of the song. Rochelle Wiseman sings the second and third verses, and backing vocals during the final chorus and the end of the song. Calvin Goldspink, Aaron Renfree, Stacey McClean, Daisy Evans, Hannah Richings and Jay Asforis do not have any solos in this song.

Music video
The video, filmed at Clarence Pier in Portsmouth, starts off with the group having a little fun on a beach, once the song begins they come to a locked up amusement park they shake the gates that keep the park closed, however the lock has the "S Club" Emblem on it, is opened and the group then open the gates and enter the park itself. During the video the group are dancing in the middle of bumper cars, shots of them roaming around the park and going on the rides themselves such as the carousel and the roller-coaster. By the end of the video the night draws in, after the group's day in the amusements ends they head their way back out of the amusement park all light up in the night as they close off the gates placing the lock back into place as the camera zooms into the "S Club" Lock.

Track listings
UK CD1
 "Fool No More"
 "S Club Party" (S Club 8 and S Club 7 United!)
 "Rush"
 "Fool No More" (video)

UK CD2
 "Fool No More"
 "Fool No More" (karaoke version)
 "One Step Closer"
 Enhanced section

UK cassette single
 "Fool No More"
 "Fool No More" (Almighty mix)

Credits and personnel
Credits are lifted from the UK CD1 liner notes.

Studio
 Mastered at Transfermation (London, England)

Personnel

 Ian Curnow – writing
 Georgie Dennis – writing
 Ricky Hanley – writing
 Darren Woodford – writing
 Pete Davis – keyboards
 Jewels & Stone – production
 Tim "Spag" Speight – mixing
 Richard Dowling – mastering

Charts

Weekly charts

Year-end charts

References

S Club 8 songs
2003 singles
2003 songs
Polydor Records singles
Songs written by Ian Curnow